In Boolean logic, a formula for a Boolean function  f is in Blake canonical form (BCF), also called the complete sum of prime implicants, the complete sum, or the disjunctive prime form, when it is a disjunction of all the prime implicants of f.

Relation to other forms

The Blake canonical form is a special case of disjunctive normal form.

The Blake canonical form is not necessarily minimal (upper diagram), however all the terms of a minimal sum are contained in the Blake canonical form. On the other hand, the Blake canonical form is a canonical form, that is, it is unique up to reordering, whereas there can be multiple minimal forms (lower diagram). Selecting a minimal sum from a Blake canonical form amounts in general to solving the set cover problem, so is NP-hard.

History
Archie Blake presented his canonical form at a meeting of the American Mathematical Society in 1932, and in his 1937 dissertation.

Methods for calculation
Blake discussed three methods for calculating the canonical form: exhaustion of implicants, iterated consensus, and multiplication. The iterated consensus method was rediscovered by Edward W. Samson and Burton E. Mills, Willard Quine, and Kurt Bing.

See also
 Horn clause
 Consensus theorem
 Quine–McCluskey algorithm

References

Normal forms (logic)